Pascua caudilinea, the Pascua goby, is a species of goby endemic to the waters around Easter Island. This species can reach a length of  SL (standard length).

References
 Randall, J. E. (2005):  Pascua caudilinea, a New Genus and Species of Gobiid Fish (Perciformes: Gobiidae) from Easter Island.  Zoological Studies, 44 (1): 19-25

Gobiidae
Fish described in 2005
Fauna of Easter Island